The 2011–12 Bangalore Super Division was the ninth season of the Bangalore Super Division which is the third tier of the Indian football system and the top tier of the Karnataka football system.

At the end of the season it was KGF Academy who finished as the champions, while BEL and CIL were relegated to A Division.

Teams

Table

References

Bangalore Super Division seasons
3